Modes of transport in Gabon include rail, road, water, and air. The one rail link, the Trans-Gabon Railway, connects the port of Owendo with the inland town of Franceville. Most but not all of the country is connected to the road network, much of which is unpaved, and which centres on seven "national routes" identified as N1 to N7. The largest seaports are Port-Gentil and the newer Owendo, and 1,600 km of inland waterways are navigable. There are three international airports, eight other paved airports, and over 40 with unpaved runways. Nearly 300 km of pipelines carry petroleum products, mainly crude oil.

Rail transport 

Until the 1970s Gabon had no permanent railroads, though temporary Decauville rail tracks were in use in the logging industry as early as 1913 (Gray and Ngolet, 1999, pp.102). 

In 2003, the railway began the process of installing a satellite based telecommunications system. As of 2004, Gabon State Railways totalled 814 km of standard-gauge track.

total: 814 km (Gabon State Railways or OCTRA)standard gauge: 814 km 1.435-m gauge; single track (1994)

Maps 
 UN Map - shows line to Franceville
 UNHCR map - does not show line to Franceville
 TravelPortal map - shows major rivers
 UNJLC Rail map of Southern Africa - does not show line to Franceville

Cities served by rail 

 Existing
 Libreville - capital
 Owendo - port
 Sahoué - port
 Franceville - railhead
 Ndjolé
 Lopé
 Booué - likely junction for branchline to Makokou
 Lastoursville
 Moanda
 Ntoum - proposed junction for iron ore traffic to Santa Clara
 Kango
 Four-Place
 Mounana - ?

Proposed
 Makokou - iron ore
 Cape Santa Clara - proposed deep water port for Makokou iron ore.
 Bélinga - possible iron ore mine.

2006 
 China signs a deal for an iron ore mine with associated rail and port upgrades from Belinga to Santa Clara

2007 
 New rail line from Belinga will go 450 km all the way to the coast, rather than to be a branch off an existing line.
 Pan-African issues

Road transport 
total:
7,670 km
paved:
629 km (including 30 km of expressways)
unpaved:
7,041 km (1996 est.)

Roads in Gabon link most areas of the country, and many of the main roads are of a reasonable standard.  However, remoter areas along the coast and in the east are often not connected to the road network.  Major roads are denoted national routes and numbered, with a prefix "N" (sometimes "RN"):

N1 road: Libreville – Kougouleu – Bifoun – Lambaréné – Mouila – Ndendé – Tchibanga - (Republic of Congo)
N2 road: Bifoun – Alembe – Viate – Mitzic – Bibasse – Oyem – Bitam – Éboro – (Cameroon)
N3 road: Alembe – Kazamabika – Lastoursville – Moanda – Franceville
N4 road: Viate – Ekonlong – Makokou – Mékambo
N5 road: Kougouleu – Bibasse
N6 road: Mayumba – Tchibanga – Ndendé – Lébamba - Koulamoutou – Lastoursville
N7 road: Makokou – Bakwaka – Okondja – Lékori - Akiéni – Ngouoni – Franceville

Water transport

Merchant marine 
As of 2002, there was one merchant marine vessel, with a gross tonnage of 2,419/.

Waterways
Gabon has 1,600 km of perennially navigable waterways, including 310 km on the Ogooué River.

Air transport
There are three international airports: Libreville, Port-Gentil, and Franceville.

Airports - with paved runways 
total:
11
over 3,047 m:
1
2,438 to 3,047 m:
1
1,524 to 2,437 m:
8
914 to 1,523 m:
1 (1999 est.)

Airports - with unpaved runways 
total:
45
1,524 to 2,437 m:
9
914 to 1,523 m:
16
under 914 m:
25 (1999 est.)

Pipelines 
Crude oil 270 km; petroleum products 14 km

See also 
 COMILOG Cableway

References

External links